Yíngpán (营盘) may refer to the following locations in China:

 Yingpan, Beihai, town in Tieshangang District, Beihai, Guangxi
 Yingpan, Zhashui County, town in Zhashui County, Shaanxi
 Yingpan, Fengqing County, town in Fengqing County, Yunnan
 Yingpan, Lanping County, town in Lanping Bai and Pumi Autonomous County, Yunnan